The Williams FW21 was the car the Williams Formula One team used to compete in the 1999 Formula One season.  It was driven by Ralf Schumacher, who had swapped from Jordan with Heinz-Harald Frentzen, and Alessandro Zanardi who had last raced in Formula One in 1994, but had since won the CART championship twice.

Design

Livery 
Williams used 'Winfield' logos, except at the French and British Grands Prix.

Engine 
This was also the team's last season using a Renault engine (badged as a customer Supertec) until one was fitted in the race winning FW34 in 2012; with a new works deal with BMW being activated for the 2000 season.

Season summary 
Although Schumacher had a successful season and was a consistent front-runner with the all-new design of the FW21, Zanardi struggled all season with the handling characteristics of the then-recently introduced grooved tyres and failed to score a point. He was dropped at the end of the year in favour of Formula Three driver Jenson Button. 

The team eventually finished fifth in the Constructors' Championship, with 35 points, all scored by Schumacher and thus Williams ended up with their worst season since 1990.

Complete Formula One results
(key) (results in bold indicate pole position, results in italic indicate fastest laps)

References
AUTOCOURSE 1999-2000, Henry, Alan (ed.), Hazleton Publishing Ltd. (1999) 

Specific

External links

Williams Formula One cars
1999 Formula One season cars